Tina Gunn Robison was an American basketball player for the BYU Cougars women's basketball team from 1976 to 1980. During her senior year, she was named to the Kodak All-America first team, the American Women's Sports Federation first team, and the National Scouting Association All-American team. She still holds many school records, putting her among the top women's basketball players to have ever played for BYU.

Although she was not raised a Mormon, she joined the LDS Church her senior year. She graduated from BYU in 1980 with a degree in chemical engineering and, despite being a first-round pick by the Milwaukee Does in the Women's Basketball League draft, decided not to pursue a professional career.

In 1990, she was the BYU Hall of Fame Inductee, and she still holds the following records:

References

External links

Living people
Year of birth missing (living people)
All-American college women's basketball players
American women's basketball players
BYU Cougars women's basketball players